Novice is a city in Coleman County, Texas, United States. Its population was 139 at the 2010 census.

Geography

Novice is located in northwestern Coleman County.

Demographics

2020 census

As of the 2020 United States census, there were 122 people, 30 households, and 12 families residing in the city.

2000 census
As of the census of 2000,  142 people, 57 households, and 40 families were residing in the city. The population density was 314.2 people/sq mi (121.8/km). The 65 housing units averaged 143.8/sq mi (55.8/km). The racial makeup of the city was 98.6% White, 0.7% Native American, and 0.7% from two or more races. Hispanics or Latinos of any race were 5.63% of the population.

Of the 57 households,  28.1% had children under 18 living with them, 63.2% were married couples living together, 5.3% had a female householder with no husband present, and 29.8% were not families. About 28.1% of all households were made up of individuals, and 14.0% had someone living alone who was 65 years of age or older. The average household size was 2.49, and the average family size was 3.08.

In the city, the age distribution was 27.5% under 18, 4.2% from 18 to 24, 29.6% from 25 to 44, 19.0% from 45 to 64, and 19.7% who were 65  or older. The median age was 39 years. For every 100 females, there were 100.0 males. For every 100 females age 18 and over, there were 102.0 males.

The median income for a household in the city was $30,833, and for a family was $32,000. Males had a median income of $22,250 versus $16,250 for females. The per capita income for the city was $11,766. About 14.3% of families and 19.3% of the population were living below the poverty line, including 26.5% of those under 18 and 11.1% of those over 64.

Education
The city was served by the Novice Independent School District until June 2012. In the summer of 2012, Novice ISD board members voted to consolidate with a neighboring school district, but the exact plans had yet to be decided. The district formally consolidated with Coleman ISD on March 1, 2013.

Notable people

 Randy McAllister, born in Dallas, Texas; American blues and Americana drummer, harmonica player, singer, and songwriter was raised in Novice

References

Cities in Texas
Cities in Coleman County, Texas